Manuel Tames is a municipality and town in the Guantánamo Province of Cuba. Its administrative seat is located in the town of Jamaica.

Geography

Demographics
In 2004, the municipality of Manuel Tames had a population of 14,200.

See also
List of cities in Cuba
Municipalities of Cuba

References

External links

Populated places in Guantánamo Province